The Williamsville Christian Church, also known as the Meeting House, is a historic Disciples of Christ church located at Williamsville in Erie County, New York.  It is a -story brick Italianate-style structure constructed in 1871 and remodeled in about 1900.

Organized some forty years earlier, the evangelical congregation had been meeting in simple quarters nearby. They were a 
dedicated, community-minded group and are credited with having founded the first secondary school in the area, the Williamsville Classical Institute.

In 1976, following a decline in congregation, the building was turned over to the Village of Williamsville for community use and for preservation.

This historic building features a rose window facing Main Street. This window and the twelve arched and arcaded windows  of the church contain three kinds of glass, the original stenciled glass, pebble glass, and newer leaded glass.

It was added to the National Register of Historic Places in 2002.

References

Churches on the National Register of Historic Places in New York (state)
Italianate architecture in New York (state)
Churches completed in 1871
19th-century churches in the United States
Churches in Erie County, New York
Rebuilt churches in the United States
National Register of Historic Places in Erie County, New York